Lynne Bowker (born 1969)  is a Canadian linguist. She is a Professor of Translation and Information Studies at the University of Ottawa and a Fellow of the Royal Society of Canada.

Early life and education
Bowker was born in 1969. She earned her Bachelor of Arts and Master's degree from the University of Ottawa before travelling to Europe to attend the University of Manchester Institute of Science and Technology and Dublin City University.

Career
Upon completing her PhD, Bowker joined the faculty at University of Ottawa's School of Translation and Interpretation in 2002. While there, she published Computer Aided Translation Technology: A Practical Introduction and accepted a cross appointment to their School of Information Studies. In 2011, Bowker was named to the Membership Advisory Committee of the Association for Library and Information Science Education for a two-year term. The following year, she was appointed to the rank of Full professor. In 2019 she became a Concordia Library researcher-in-residence to study the best approaches for machine translations.

Awards
In 2013, Bowker was awarded a $15,000 Research award from the Association for Library and Information Science Education (ALISE)/Online Computer Library Center (OCLC) to investigate the use of machine translation in helping newcomers to Canada to make better use of the public library.

In 2015, Bowker received the Canadian Association of Translation Studies Best Paper Award for her article "The Need for Speed! Experimenting with 'Speed Training' in the Scientific/Technical Translation Classroom." 

Bowker was elected a Fellow of the Royal Society of Canada for her "research excellence and important contributions throughout her career." In the same year, she was the recipient of the inaugural Open Educational Resources Grant from the university library.

Selected publications
The following is a list of selected publications:

Books
 Lynne Bowker and Jairo Buitrago Ciro. Machine Translation and Global Research: Towards Improved Machine Translation Literacy in the Scholarly Community. (2019)
 Lynne Bowker and Jennifer Pearson. Working with Specialized Language: A Practical Guide to Using Corpora (2002)
 Lynne Bowker. Computer-aided Translation Technology: A Practical Introduction (2002)

Journal articles

 Lynne Bowker and Shane Hawkins. (2006). "Variation in the organization of medical terms: Exploring some motivations for term choice," Terminology: International Journal of Theoretical and Applied Issues in Specialized Communication, 12.1 p. 79 - 110. 
 Lynne Bowker. (1998). "Using specialized monolingual native-language corpora as a translation resource: A pilot study," Meta: journal des traducteurs.

References

External links

Living people
1969 births
Alumni of Dublin City University
Alumni of the University of Manchester Institute of Science and Technology
University of Ottawa alumni
Academic staff of the University of Ottawa
Fellows of the Royal Society of Canada
Linguists from Canada
Women linguists